Gynura aurantiaca, called purple passion or velvet plant, is a species of flowering plant in the daisy family Asteraceae. It is native to Southeast Asia but grown in many other places as a house plant. In warm regions, it is frequently grown outdoors on patios and in gardens rather than inside buildings, and hence it has escaped into the wild in Africa, Australia, South America, Mesoamerica, Florida, and a few other places.

Description
As a house plant, the long trailing vines are appropriate for a hanging pot or similar arrangement. Leaves, stems, and bracts are dark green, covered with soft purple hairs that impart a velvety feeling to the plant. One plant can produce 1-5 flower heads, each on its own flower stalk. The flowers have a rather strong odour. Each head contains several yellow, orange, or red disc flowers but no ray flowers.

Etymology
The Latin specific epithet aurantiaca means ”orange”, referring to the usual colour of the blooms.

Horticulture
In cultivation in the UK this plant has gained the Royal Horticultural Society’s Award of Garden Merit.

References

External links

aurantiaca
Flora of Asia
Plants described in 1826
House plants